Liebigia is a genus of flowering plants belonging to the family Gesneriaceae.

It is native to Java, Sumatera and Lesser Sunda Islands.

The genus name of Liebigia is in honour of Justus von Liebig (1803–1873), a German scientist who made major contributions to agricultural and biological chemistry, and is considered one of the principal founders of organic chemistry. 
It was first described and published in Gen. Pl. on page 1407 in 1841.

Known species
According to Kew:
Liebigia adenonema 
Liebigia barbata 
Liebigia dissimilis 
Liebigia glabra 
Liebigia horsfieldii 
Liebigia leuserensis 
Liebigia limans 
Liebigia neoforbesii 
Liebigia polyneura 
Liebigia praeterita 
Liebigia tenuipes 
Liebigia tobaensis

References

Didymocarpoideae
Gesneriaceae genera
Plants described in 1845
Flora of Java
Flora of Sumatra
Flora of the Lesser Sunda Islands